Paduka Seri Begawan Sultan Science College (abbreviated as MSPSBS, or simply ) is a selective government secondary school and sixth form college in Bandar Seri Begawan, Brunei. It was founded in 1966 and is named after the 28th Sultan of Brunei, Sultan Omar Ali Saifuddien III.

Location 
The school is located on Jalan Muara, close to the Brunei International Airport, commercial areas and two other educational institutions - Berakas Secondary School and the Sultan Saiful Rijal Campus of the Institute of Brunei Technical Education.

History
Upper secondary level (Form 4) was introduced in the school in 1967 while sixth form was introduced two years later. In 1969, the school moved from Brunei Town to an area along Jalan Muara.

It was inaugurated by the late Sultan Omar Ali Saifuddien III, the 28th Sultan of Brunei and the father of the current Sultan Hassanal Bolkiah.

Bilingual education policy was implemented in 1974 and English medium classes were introduced. Two years later science education was started.

In 1985, the status of the school was upgraded to a college to acknowledge the inclusion of the sixth form and the school finally adopted the current name.

In 1994, the college moved to a new campus in the Rimba area on the outskirts of Bandar Seri Begawan. After renovations of the old Muara campus was completed, the college moved back to it on 2 April 2005. The Rimba campus was turned into the Rimba Secondary School. Starting from 2007, classes for Form 1 (now known as Year 7) students were scheduled in the afternoon due to a shortage of classrooms. In 2008, Year 8 students were also scheduled in the afternoon session. Year 7 students in 2008 were the first batch to try out the scheme of work for SPN21 (Sistem Pendidikan Negara Abad Ke-21).

Enrolment and structure
Entry to the college requires grade "A" in all five subjects (hence more commonly known as "5 'A's") of the Primary School Assessment ( or ), the national examination taken at the end of Year 6 in primary school.

The school operates in a two sub-school structure. The secondary school caters for students in years 7 to 10, whilst the Sixth Form Centre caters for students in Lower and Upper Six. The school enrolls students only for Year 7 every year, prohibiting entries for other years. Only current enrolled Year 7 students are allowed to proceed to upper levels. The size of classes vary each year, depending on the entrance quotas.

Uniform
The school uniform for boys consists of purple pants for years 7 to 10 and grey pants for sixth form students, white MIB shirt with embroidered school logo and a black songkok.

Girls' uniforms are long white and lavender checkered skirt for years 7 to 10 and long grey skirt for sixth form students, white dress and a school embroidered square tudong.

Members of the student councils wear the same uniform with the exception of the colour of their pants and long skirts, which are navy blue.

A different uniform applies for physical education classes.

Extracurricular activities
Aside from academics, the school provides a wide range of extracurricular activities for its students. These include: Debate (Gavel Club), Da Vinci, Drama and Theatre, Environmental Club and more. This is along with Swimming, Basketball, Football, Netball, Badminton, Table Tennis, Track and Field, Golf, Rugby, Hiking and Hockey.

The school takes part in interschool competitions including Science, Mathematics, Computing, Debate, Hadrah and Nasyid competitions.

The school is also known for their notable Choir, Netball, Hockey, Track and Field team, winning several titles each year. In 2013, the unofficial school team, consisting of sixth form girls, MS Rebels came second in the First National Women's Rugby Tournament. During the early years in 1978-1980 the hockey teams and netball teams were very competitive and went to national competitions. This trend still continues today.

The school has also been known to be active in extracurricular activities including a drug awareness team. The school also has an Environmental Club to encourage students on natural awareness and for class research purposes.

The college has a house system for the purpose of the annual inter-house competitions in sports (track and field, football and netball) and arts (debate and drama).

Notable alumni
Several members of Brunei's royal family attended the College including the Crown Prince of Brunei, Al-Muhtadee Billah, and his wife, Pengiran Anak Sarah, Prince Abdul Mateen, Princess Majeedah Nuruul Bolkiah, Princess Hafizah Sururul Bolkiah, Princess Azemah Ni'matul Bolkiah, and other members of Brunei's royal family attended the college including, Pengiran Muda ‘Abdul Qawi, Pengiran Muda Omar ‘Ali, Pengiran Muda ‘Abdul Muqtadir and Pengiran Anak Khalilah Khalilat ul-Bolkiah, sons and daughter of Prince Mohammed Bolkiah, the Pengiran Anak Hajjah Siti Radhiah Bolkiah, daughter of Princess Norain Bolkiah and Pengiran Anak Muhammad ‘Abdul Hafiz, Pengiran Anak Muhammad ‘Abdul Qayyum and Pengiran Anak Nurul-Amal Ni’matullah Athirah, and Pengiran Anak Nurul-Amal Munjiat ul-Athirah, sons and daughters of Princess Amal Jefriah Bolkiah .

The Science College is also known to produce most of Brunei's prominent lawyers, doctors, educators, high ranking government officers, and armed personnel.

External links
Collegewebsite

Secondary schools in Brunei
Sixth form colleges in Brunei
Cambridge schools in Brunei
Educational institutions established in 1966
1966 establishments in Brunei